Yerma is a 1984 Hungarian drama film directed by Imre Gyöngyössy and Barna Kabay, based on the play of the same name written by Federico García Lorca. The film was selected as the Hungarian entry for the Best Foreign Language Film at the 57th Academy Awards, but was not accepted as a nominee.

Plot
Yerma, a beautiful young woman, lives with her husband Juan in one of the villages of idyllic Andalusia. They both long for a child, but Juan can not fulfill his wife's desire.

Cast
 Mareike Carrière as María
 Mathieu Carrière as Víctor
 Róbert Gergely as Leonardo
 Titusz Kovács as Juan, Yerma's Husband
 Gudrun Landgrebe as Yerma
 Mária Sulyok as Dolores
 Hédi Temessy as Magdalena

See also
 List of submissions to the 57th Academy Awards for Best Foreign Language Film
 List of Hungarian submissions for the Academy Award for Best Foreign Language Film

References

External links
 

1984 films
1984 drama films
Hungarian drama films
1980s Hungarian-language films